Point of Terror is a 1971 American erotic drama horror film directed by Alex Nicol and starring Peter Carpenter and Dyanne Thorne.

Plot
Lounge singer Tony Trelos is approached by a buxom blonde woman on a beach one afternoon. Her name is Andrea Hilliard, and she is a wealthy woman whose crippled husband Martin owns a record label. That night, Andrea goes to watch Tony perform at his regular oceanside California club. She offers to cut him a record deal. Tony begins a sexual relationship with her, and begins ignoring Sally, a former flame of his. Unbeknownst to Tony, Andrea murdered Martin's former wife in their home after having begun an affair with him nine years before.

One evening, Martin confronts Andrea, saying he witnessed her having sex with Tony in their swimming pool earlier that night. In a tussle, Andrea pushes Martin into the pool, and watches him drown. After his death, Martin's daughter, Helayne, arrives from Europe where she has been attending college. After the funeral, Tony is told by Andrea's alcoholic friend, Fran, that Martin's ex-wife was murdered by an unknown intruder, and that Helayne was sent to several boarding schools in Europe after Andrea and Martin married.

Tony seduces Helayne, which drives Andrea mad. One evening, on a cliff near Andrea's home, the two get into an argument, and she attempts to murder him, but Tony throws her over the edge to the rocks below, killing her. Helayne witnesses the event, and the two embrace. Upon returning to the house, Tony is confronted by Sally, who shoots him to death. He then awakens on the beach, where Andrea approaches him; all that has occurred has been a premonition.

Cast
Peter Carpenter as Tony Trelos
Dyanne Thorne as Andrea Hilliard
Lory Hansen as Helayne Hilliard
Leslie Simms as Fran
Joel Marston as Martin Hilliard
Paula Mitchell as Sally
Dana Diamond as Waitress
Al Dunlap as Charlie
Ernest A. Charles as Detective
Roberta Robson as First Wife
Tony Kent as Priest

Home media
Point of Terror was released on January 31, 2017, as a double feature on Blu-ray with Blood Mania (1970), also starring Carpenter, by Vinegar Syndrome. The first 3,000 units of the release also feature a bonus disc containing the television cuts of each film. It's also on Mill Creek Entertainment's "Tales of Terror" 200 movie DVD set.

References

External links

1971 films
1971 horror films
1970s erotic drama films
American erotic drama films
American exploitation films
Crown International Pictures films
Films shot in Los Angeles
American erotic horror films
1970s English-language films
1970s American films